Umerpura Chak No.50 R/B ਟਿਵਾਨਾ, ٹوانہ Tiwana is a village in Shahkot tehsil, Nankana Sahib District, Punjab, Pakistan. It has a primary school and a girls' middle school.

History of the village name
The first name of Tiwana village was Tibbi Qazian. Malik Umar Hayat Khan Tiwana was a general in the British Army, who was awarded the village.

Tiwana is a Punjabi caste that hails from the Punjab region of Pakistan and India. Tiwana is a Jat and Rajput clan. Tiwanas from India are Sikhs, while Tiwanas from Pakistan are Muslim Rajputs, such as Malik Umar Hayat Khan.

Populated places in Nankana Sahib District